The Antilopines are even-toed ungulates belonging to the subfamily Antilopinae of the family Bovidae. The members of tribe Antilopini include the gazelles, blackbucks, springboks, gerenuks, dibatags, and Central Asian gazelles, are often referred to as true antelopes. True antelopes occur in much of Africa and Asia, with the highest concentration of species occurring in East Africa in Sudan, Eritrea, Ethiopia, Somalia, Kenya, and Tanzania. The saigas (tribe Saigini) and Tibetan antelopes inhabit much of central and western Asia. The dwarf antelopes  of tribe Neotragini live entirely in sub-Saharan Africa.

Classification
Family Bovidae
 Subfamily Antilopinae
 Tribe Antilopini
 Genus Ammodorcas
 Dibatag Ammodorcas clarkei
 Genus Antidorcas
 Springbok Antidorcas marsupialis
 Genus Antilope
 Blackbuck Antilope cervicapra
 Genus Eudorcas 
 Mongalla gazelle Eudorcas albonotata
 Red gazelle Eudorcas rufina †
 Red-fronted gazelle Eudorcas rufrifrons
 Thomson's gazelle Eudorcas thomsoni
 Heuglin's gazelle Eudorcas tilonura
 Genus Gazella
 Subgenus Deprezia
 Gazella psolea †
 Subgenus Gazella 
 Arabian gazelle Gazella arabica 
 European gazelle Gazella borbonica †
 Chinkara or Indian gazelle Gazella benettii
 Queen of Sheba's gazelle Gazella bilkis †
 Dorcas gazelle Gazella dorcas
 Mountain gazelle Gazella gazella
 Saudi gazelle Gazella saudiya †
 Speke's gazelle Gazella spekei
 Subgenus Trachelocele
 Cuvier's gazelle Gazella cuvieri
 Rhim gazelle or slender-horned gazelle Gazella leptoceros
 Goitered gazelle Gazella subgutturosa
 Genus Litocranius 
 Gerenuk Litocranius walleri
 Genus Nanger
 Dama gazelle Nanger dama
 Grant's gazelle Nanger granti
 Soemmerring's gazelle Nanger soemmerringii
 Genus Procapra
 Zeren Procapra gutturosa
 Goa Procapra picticaudata
 Przewalski's gazelle Procapra przewalskii
 Tribe Saigini 
 Genus Saiga
 Saiga Saiga tatarica
 Tribe Neotragini
 Genus Dorcatragus 
 Beira Dorcatragus megalotis
 Genus Madoqua
 Günther's dik-dik Madoqua guntheri
 Kirk's dik-dik Madoqua kirkii
 Silver dik-dik Madoqua piacentinii
 Salt's dik-dik Madoqua saltiana
 Genus Neotragus
 Royal antelope Neotragus pygmaeus
 Genus Ourebia
 Oribi Ourebia ourebi
 Genus Raphicerus
 Steenbok Raphicerus campestris
 Cape grysbok Raphicerus melanotis
 Sharpe's grysbok Raphicerus sharpei

Fossil genera
†Demecquenemia
†Deprezia 
†Dytikodorcas
†Hispanodorcas
†Homoiodorcas
†Majoreas
†Nisidorcas
†Ouzocerus
†Parantidorcas
†Parastrepsiceros
†Praemadoqua
†Prostrepsiceros
†Sinapodorcas
†Tyrrhenotragus

References

 
Bovidae
Mammal subfamilies
Taxa named by John Edward Gray